Moran Lavi (born 3 February 1983) is an Israeli football player who plays as a midfielder for ASA Tel Aviv University.

International goals

Honours 
ASA Tel Aviv University
Winner
 Ligat Nashim (6): 1999–2000, 2009–10, 2010–11, 2011–12, 2012–13, 2013–14, 2014–15
 Israeli Women's Cup (3): 2010–11, 2011–12, 2013–14

References

External links 
 

1983 births
Living people
Israeli Jews
Israeli women's footballers
Israel women's international footballers
ASA Tel Aviv University players
Women's association football midfielders
TCU Horned Frogs women's soccer players
Footballers from Kfar Saba